The Long Mynd is a heath and moorland plateau that forms part of the Shropshire Hills in Shropshire, England. The high ground, which is common land and designated as an Area of Outstanding Natural Beauty, lies between the Stiperstones range to the west and the Stretton Hills and Wenlock Edge to the east. Much of it is owned by the National Trust, and is managed by the Longmynd Commoners.

In its vicinity are the principal settlements of Church Stretton, Little Stretton and All Stretton, Pulverbatch, Smethcott, Woolstaston, Asterton, Myndtown, Wentnor and Ratlinghope.

The highest point on the Long Mynd is Pole Bank; this and the adjacent hill of Caer Caradoc are classed as Marilyns.

Etymology
The name Long Mynd means "long mountain", the second element being Brittonic in origin. In modern Welsh it is named Mynydd Hir , which has the same meaning, or Cefn Hirfynydd, meaning "long mountain ridge".

Commoning on Long Mynd
There is pollen evidence to show that trees began to be replaced by grass on the plateau of the Long Mynd from the Bronze Age over 2,000 years ago and written evidence of organised management as a grazed common from the 13th century over 700 years ago. The Longmynd commoners’ ponies and sheep grazed here are hardy animals and are well adapted to the harsh conditions of life on the hill. They graze selectively and very close to the ground, leaving patches of long vegetation which benefits insects and small mammals.

This grazing pattern has resulted in a special ecology and the Long Mynd Common is therefore designated as a Site of Special Scientific Interest. To enhance the ecology the Longmynd commoners have, since 1999 been in an environmental stewardship scheme that also supports sustainable farming practices.

Livestock grazing plays an important role in maintaining species-rich habitats by controlling the more aggressive plant species which would otherwise dominate the area.

Other than the boundary fence which is largely maintained by the Longmynd commoners, there is no other fencing on the hill that restricts the movement of livestock. Therefore to undertake routine husbandry tasks, Longmynd commoners use dogs to gather their flocks together before driving them off the hill back to the farm. The sheep from each farm know instinctively where their flock’s grazing boundary is. This ancient practice, known as hefting, is passed down the generations of sheep through the shepherding by the Longmynd commoners.

Geology

Precambrian
The geology dates back to the Precambrian, and during at least part of that long period this area would have been around 60° south of the equator, the same as the current latitude of the Falkland Islands. Shropshire would have been at the very edge of a large continent near the sea, which was being buckled by tectonic activity, causing volcanoes to form. The area had broad rivers; evidence of mudflats has been found. The rivers would have flowed out to sea, creating large estuaries; over time, the mudflats would have built up, and volcanic eruptions deposited ash in layers between the sand and mud. The primary rock of the Long Mynd is sandstone, usually coloured purple or grey. The volcanoes created the nearby Stretton Hills and the Wrekin, and eruptions would have been frequent. There are layers in the rocks of the Long Mynd that were previously described as raindrop marks. Unpublished research, including electron micrographs, by the now deceased Professor Martin Brasier, showed that these are actually ichnofossils created by an unknown Ediacaran biota. Field observations of the stratigraphy present, and its laminar nature, leave no doubt that they are in a marine environment; the absence of infilled or mineralised syncresis (shrinkage cracks) adds to this. Examples of these fossilised marks can be viewed today in the National Trust tearoom exhibition, in Carding Mill Valley. The stratigraphy, mineral compositions and surrounding volcanology suggests an infilling island arc basin.

Towards the end of the Precambrian, the volcanoes ceased their eruptions, and the rivers had dried up. Instead the forces that created the volcanoes caused the new rocks to lift and fold, creating mountains and valleys in the area. Much of the rock was melted during this period, underneath the Earth's crust, causing the mountains to continually change towards the latter part of the Precambrian. The Church Stretton Fault Zone probably formed during this period. It is still active today. The hill of Caer Caradoc adjacent to the Long Mynd and from the same time is volcanic in origin, and is thought to be a remnant of the great mountain chain.

Palaeozoic
During the Cambrian, Shropshire was flooded by the sea, after the Global Ice Age ended 539 million years ago. Thick layers of beach pebbles and white sand were built up against the sea cliffs that were once molten lava. During this time, the shallow sea played host to the huge explosion of new life which occurred during the Cambrian. Shropshire has some of the most historically important evidence in the explosion of life and this is referred to in the naming and dividing of the Cambrian period. Trilobites that are found in the county are internationally important for deciding how the Cambrian is divided into smaller segments of time.

The Ordovician had Shropshire back to volcanic activity, and saw the county temporarily split in two, along the Pontesford – Linley fault line. Everything west of this line was ocean, while the east was dry land. The Iapetus Ocean was closing, bringing the two halves of Britain towards each other, and volcanic eruptions created the Cumbrian Mountains and Snowdonia. Shropshire also saw volcanic activity. To the west of the Pontesford – Linley fault, volcanic rocks have been found. The other side of the fault line was quieter. The land was slowly eroded, and the sea gradually flooded it, so that only the tops of hills could be seen, such as the ancient Caer Caradoc. Towards the end of the Ordovician, the sea levels dropped, due to another ice age. An interesting observation of this erosion can be found in the stratigraphy as a sea stump (an eroded sea stack).

The Silurian period, around 439 million years ago, has been well preserved nearby, in Wenlock Edge. During this time, Shropshire would have been flooded again by shallow sea. Wenlock Edge would have formed during this time, and the fossils of ancient corals and shellfish can be found all along the edge, preserved in limestone. Towards the end of the Silurian the Iapetus Ocean would have fully closed, and England and Scotland were joined. The closing of this ocean was important to geology in Great Britain. It caused most of our hills and mountains to align along the fault, northeast to the southwest.

During the Devonian, the newly formed Scottish mountains had rivers flowing all over the land. Shropshire was no exception; these new rivers caused thick deposits in the area. Most of the rocks from this era are red sandstones, with iron in the rock. The area was known as the Old Red Sandstone Continent. These river sediments have traces of fossilised fish. Shropshire would have remained above water until the end of the Devonian, when the seas rose once again.

The Carboniferous was a time of great change for the area. Shropshire would have been near the equator, and the Old Red Sandstone continent had been eroded away; in the early part of the period, the county was under a shallow sea. However, tectonic activity pushed Britain out of the sea. South of Shropshire this effect was felt greatly, though Shropshire was relatively quiet. Mountains to the north were being worn down by rivers, creating enormous deltas that were colonised by plant life. A tropical forest took hold all over Shropshire, with ancient tree ferns and horsetails. Shropshire eventually crossed the equator during this era, and became a part of Pangaea during the Permian; the area would have been very similar to the Sahara Desert, and would have been in the vicinity, around 20° to 30° north of the equator.

Mesozoic and Cenozoic
The Triassic, Jurassic, Cretaceous and Tertiary were very quiet in Shropshire, and very little evidence can be found from these periods. The last ice age during the Quaternary has its effect on all of Shropshire, shaping the landscape as we see it today. The Long Mynd would have been under a thick ice sheet, several hundred metres thick. As the ice melted, it carved out the valleys and hills of the Long Mynd massif we see today. The small rivers, streams and brooks still very slowly carve out the valleys.

Today the steep and narrow valleys are covered in a thin layer of acidic soil, able to support only strong grasses, rushes and heathers. Beneath the soil the evidence of the ancient and chequered past can be seen, and the rocky outcrops and scree slopes are excellent places to view the different layers of ancient rock.

From 2006, University of Cambridge scientists monitored seismic activity in the Long Mynd. The broadband seismometer was connected to the internet, and real-time traces viewable online.

History

Bronze Age

The Bronze Age period is by far the most recorded period of time on the Long Mynd. There are dozens of tumuli on the moorland. Some are small, the remains of chamber tombs for example. Others are quite large, the sites on the Long Mynd, from the Bronze Age, include dykes, cross-ridge dykes and barrows.

It runs across the narrowest area of a ridge between Grindle Hill and Round Hill. At both ends of the Cross Ridge Dyke, it fades into the steep hillside. A gap in the dyke,  from the south-east end, is thought to make room for a trackway along the ridge. Its purpose was to cut off Grindle Hill from the main plateau, and to create a barrier for access from the west.

Devil's Mouth Cross-Ridge Dyke lies between Cardingmill Valley and Townbrook Valley. Both ends of the dyke end on steep slopes! It is roughly 1,500 years old. It was probably built to control the access along the ancient east to west route, which still crosses the Long Mynd today by means of a modern road.

High Park Cross-Ridge Dyke, another dyke on the Long Mynd. At  it is the longest on the Long Mynd. A trackway, like that found on Barristers Plain Cross-Ridge Dyke, cuts through the dyke.

Of the Long Mynd Barrows, over twenty scatter the plateau. The best examples are in the northern area of the Long Mynd.

The Shooting Box Barrow is named after a grouse-shooting hut that stood on the site until it was removed in 1992. It had been dated to  1950–1700 BC.

It is still walked today, and is part of the Shropshire Way, and a road that goes to the Gliding Club. A common misconception is that it goes over Pole Bank, but instead it bypasses the hill, following its contours.

Iron Age

Very little Iron Age human activity has been recorded on the Long Mynd. However, this later period has a specific ancient site.

This feature dates from the Iron Age,  500 BC, and is therefore much later than other ancient sites on the Long Mynd. Another hill fort nearby sits on the summit of Caer Caradoc. Bodbury Ring is now looked after by the National Trust.

18th century

During the 18th century, Church Stretton began to grow in the wide valley between the Long Mynd and Caer Caradoc, as a market town, and later a spa. Historically the town was known for its textiles, specifically in Cardingmill Valley. Carding Mill was built in the 18th century, and named after a stage in making cloth, the three stages being carding, spinning and weaving. Carding would have been done by children, and involved using a hand-card that removed and untangled short fibres from the mass of raw material. The cards were wooden blocks with handles and covered in metal spikes, which were angled, (to make it easier to untangle) and set in leather. When untangled, the material would be spun, and then weaved into the final product. The mill is still in the valley today, but has been converted into luxury apartments. The Long Mynd Hotel in Church Stretton was built in 1900, originally as the Hydro, at a time when the town was popular as a spa.

20th century

A large area of the Long Mynd (almost all its upland area) was bought by the National Trust in 1965, and was designated an AONB as part of the Shropshire Hills in 1958.

Highest points

The Long Mynd comprises many hills and moors. From the summit of nearly every hill, there are extensive views of the surrounding area and surrounding counties. North, one can see as far as Cheshire; west commands views over the Stiperstones, and into Wales; the Cambrian Mountains in Powys, notably the Berwyn range and as far as Snowdonia on clear days. The views east are obscured by other areas of the Shropshire Hills, Caer Caradoc, the Wrekin and the Clee Hills. From some locations there are views of the West Midlands. Views south are towards Clun Forest, Craven Arms and Ludlow. The highest points on the Long Mynd are as follows in order of highest to lowest, with comparisons of other nearby hills and the level of Church Stretton in bold.

Brown Clee Hill 
Stiperstones 
Pole Bank 
Long Synalds 
Wild Moor 
Calf Ridge 
Haddon Hill 
Yearlet 
Round Hill 
Caer Caradoc 
Grindle 
Knolls 
Minton Hill 
Cow Ridge 
Packetstone Hill 
Nills 
Ashlet 
Black Knoll 
Callow 
The Wrekin 
Burway Hill 
Churchmoor Hill 
Bodbury Hill 
Priors Holt Hill 
Adstone Hill 
Shooters Knoll 
Stanyeld 
Novers Hill 
Castle Hill 
Church Stretton

Valleys, hollows and batches
Long Mynd comprises a multitude of valleys and the highest concentration lies along the eastern edge, near Church Stretton. Topographically many of the larger valleys lie adjacent to each other and are aligned northwest to southeast. The main valleys include:

Ashes Hollow
Barristers Batch
Bilbatch
Broadhill Dale
Burnells Brook
Callow Hollow
Carding Mill Valley
Catbatch Brook
Cwmdale
Devils Mouth Hollow
Gogbatch
Grindle Hollow
Hawkham Hollow
Hens Batch
High Park Hollow
Jonathon’s Hollow
Light Spout Hollow
Long Batch
Minton Batch
Motts Road
Mount Gutter
New Pool Hollow
Nut Batch
Pike Hollow
Rams Batch
Sleekstone Bank Hollow
Stanbatch
Stony Batch
Townsbrook Valley
Woolers Batch
Yewtree Batch

Tourism and recreation

Long Mynd is part of the Shropshire Hills designated Area of Outstanding Natural Beauty (AONB) and is a popular tourist destination, particularly due to the many footpaths, varied terrain and impressive scenery and views. Two major footpaths are the Shropshire Way and the Jack Mytton Way. The Long Mynd's open spaces make it a popular place for horse riding and mountain biking on the bridleways.

Carding mill Valley is the busiest location as it is home to the National Trust's centre for the area.

The windward slopes to the west are popular with glider, hang-glider and paraglider pilots.

In winter some valley slopes become makeshift ski slopes, but Long Mynd can be treacherous in severe weather, and has claimed many lives. In 2015 snow gates were installed at various points of access onto the Long Mynd, to deter motorists planning to use the routes in wintry conditions.<ref>Evesham Journal Regional: Snow gates installed at the Long Mynd (23 January 2015)</ref>

The Longmynd Hike is a  competitive race that crosses over the Long Mynd twice and must be completed in under 24 hours. It has been running since 1967 and takes place annually, usually on the first weekend in October.

There is a golf course, the Church Stretton Golf Club, located near the Cardingmill Valley, on the slopes of Stanyeld Hill and Bodbury Hill. It is the oldest 18-hole golf course in Shropshire, opened in 1898, and one of the highest in the country.

Cycle racing's British National Hill Climb Championship was held on the Burway, the road ascending the Long Mynd from Church Stretton, in 1989. The title was won by Chris Boardman, the second of his four National Hill Climb titles, who went on to win a gold medal at the 1992 Summer Olympics and have a successful professional cycling career.

Gliding

The Long Mynd has been home to the Midland Gliding Club since 1934. The club owns  of land on the south end and flies gliders there throughout the year. It runs residential training courses and offers members of the public trial lesson flights. Many long flights have started from the Long Mynd, most recently one of  during the summer of 2007. The gliding club is one of the few remaining clubs in Europe to regularly launch gliders by bungee. One early distinguished past member was Amy Johnson, from 1937 to 1939.

Flora and fauna
Historical grazing rights are held by the Long Mynd Commoners who graze sheep and ponies on the land. The grazing livestock slow the invasion of trees by pushing into the scrub and bracken helping to create and maintain the heath. They also graze in the pools, eating the pondweed and consequently there is a healthy population of brown trout (Salmo trutta) and otter (Lutra lutra). Tree pipit (Anthus trivialis) and red grouse (Lagopus lagopus scotica) are found here as well as the recent arrival of the grayling butterfly (Hipparchia semele).

Popular culture

The Revd E. D. Carr's A Night in the Snow describes his experience, in 1865, of surviving a winter's night on the Long Mynd when attempting to walk home after conducting a Sunday service and visiting an isolated parishioner. He spent 23 hours struggling to force a route to safety.

The Long Mynd features in literature in the poetry of A. E. Housman, the novels of Mary Webb (in particular Gone to Earth), Malcolm Saville's Lone Pine series for children, and Sheena Porter's The Knockers'' (1965).

References

External links

 The National Trust's Blog for Carding Mill Valley and Long Mynd
 Long Mynd hang-gliding & paragliding
 Long Mynd Hike
 National Trust | Carding Mill Valley
 Midland Gliding Club
 Shropshire Rocks

Church Stretton
Marilyns of England
Hills of Shropshire
Sites of Special Scientific Interest in Shropshire
Tourist attractions in Shropshire
Geology of Shropshire
Moorlands of England
National Trust properties in Shropshire